Sarapancharam is a 1979 Indian Malayalam-language drama film written and directed by Hariharan from a story by Malayattoor Ramakrishnan. It stars Jayan, Sheela, and Sathaar and Latha, with P. K. Abraham and Oduvil Unnikrishnan in supporting roles. Jayan played the role of the main antagonist in the film. It was also one of the first notable films of Oduvil Unnikrishnan, who played the role of a lawyer. It was a breakthrough film in Jayan's career.

The story line of the film is loosely based on D. H. Lawrence's 1928 novel Lady Chatterley's Lover, though there are significant differences in plot and characterisation. The film was the highest-grossing Malayalam film of 1979.

Plot 

The story concerns a young married woman, Soudamini, whose upper-class husband has been paralysed and rendered impotent. Living with her old husband she likes the servant, Chandrasekharan. And She eventually marries him but later discovers that he has had relationship with many ladies and he aimed only at her wealth. She and her only baby daughter (born from her first husband) are helpless as they are not able to put him out of their lives. Later, a young man named Prabhakaran, who is the son of an ex-servant of Soudamini, enters their life and helps them to get rid of Chandrasekharan. In the climax, Chandrasekharan is shot dead by Soudamini.

Cast 
 Jayan as Chandrasekharan
 Sheela as Saudamini
 Latha as Baby
 Sathaar as Prabhakaran
 P. K. Abraham as Saudaminis Husband
 Nellikkodu Bhaskaran as Sidhayyan
 Oduvil Unnikrishnan as Subbaiyer
 Shankar as Baby's Friend (Guest role)
 Baby Sumathi as Young Baby
 Priya as Baby
 Kottayam Shantha
 Bhaskara Kurup as Chellappan
 Sarath Babu as Baby's Friend (Guest role)
 Bhavani as Malli
 Rajan Padoor as Gopala Pilla
 Major Stanli as Young Prabhakaran

Soundtrack 
The music was composed by G. Devarajan and the lyrics were written by Yusufali Kechery.

Box office 
This film was commercial success and a breakthrough film in Jayan's career. The dialogues and body language of Jayan was well received. He began appearing in leading roles then thereafter and attained Super Star level. This film also broke many box office records and was the highest-grossing movie ever released until another Jayan films Puthiya Velicham and Other notable movies broke it.

Remake 
Director Hariharan remade the film in Hindi as Anjaam (1986).

References

External links 
 

1970s Malayalam-language films
1979 films
Films based on Lady Chatterley's Lover
Films directed by Hariharan
Works by Malayattoor Ramakrishnan